Sebastian Miniatures are a series of small ceramic sculptures or figurines first produced by Prescott Woodbury Baston Sr. in Arlington, Massachusetts in 1938.

Many pieces are of historical figures such as George Washington, but are also of classic literary characters, and scenes of life, particularly in New England, United States, where Mr Baston created his pieces. Baston also created pieces specifically for commercial uses, such as in store promotions for products such as Jell-o. Baston continued to create pieces until his death in 1984.

References

External links 

 Harryrinker.com: Harry Rinker article

Figurines
Figurine manufacturers
American pottery
1938 sculptures